WAPS may refer to:

 WAPS (FM), a radio station (91.3 FM) licensed to Akron, Ohio, United States
 Weighted Airman Promotion System
 Western Australia Police Service
 Winona Area Public Schools, a school district in Minnesota also known as Independent School District 861

See also
Wasp
WAP (disambiguation)